Lynn Anderson's Greatest Hits, Vol. 1 is a compilation album by American country artist Lynn Anderson. It was released in January 1971 via Chart Records and was produced by Slim Williamson. The package was Anderson's third compilation released in her music career and contained previous hits recordings she had for the Chart label in the 1960s. Ten tracks were included in the album's release.

Background and release
Lynn Anderson's Greatest Hits, Vol. 1 was the third compilation Chart Records issued of Anderson's material. It included material that had originally been produced by Slim Williamson for the label. Ten tracks were included on the collection. Of these recordings, only six were actually released as singles. These songs were "It Wasn't God Who Made Honky Tonk Angels", "That's a No No," "No Another Time," "Ride, Ride Ride," "Flattery Will Get You Everywhere" and "Our House Is Not a Home (For It's Never Been Loved In)." The remaining four tracks were album cuts that had also previously been issued on studio albums during her time with the Chart label.

Lynn Anderson's Greatest Hits, Vol. 1 was released in January 1971 on Chart Records. It was the third compilation released by the label and it was issued following her departure from the company (Anderson had switched to Columbia Records in 1970). It was issued as a vinyl LP, containing five tracks on each side of the record. The album spent several weeks on the Billboard Top Country Albums chart in 1971. It eventually peaked at number 40 on the chart that year. It was her second compilation to place on the record chart.

Track listing

Personnel
All credits are adapted from the liner notes of Lynn Anderson's Greatest Hits, Vol. 1.

Musical and technical personnel
 Lynn Anderson – lead vocals
 Slim Williamson – producer

Chart performance

Release history

References

1971 greatest hits albums
Albums produced by Slim Williamson
Chart Records albums
Lynn Anderson compilation albums